Trina Parks (born Trina Frazier; December 26, 1946) is an American actress, vocalist, choreographer, principal dancer and dance instructor. Parks is best known for portraying Thumper in the 1971 James Bond film Diamonds Are Forever.

Movies
{| class="wikitable sortable"
|-
! Year !! Film !! Roles
|-
| 1970 || Beyond the Valley of the Dolls ||
|-
| 1970 || The Great White Hope ||
|-
| 1971 || Diamonds Are Forever || Thumper
|-
| 1975 || Darktown Strutters || Syreena
|-
| 1976 || The Muthers || Marcie
|-
| 1980 || The Blues Brothers||Dancer in church
|-
| 2012 || Immortal Kiss: Queen of the Night || Amina 
|-
| 2020 || 111 the Force || Joy Morris
|}

Television

 Night Gallery, episode "The Phantom Farmhouse"
 McCoy - NBC Movie of the Week
 Liv and Maddie, episode "Dodge-A-Rooney"
 Dick Shawn Special - Featured singer/dancer - CBS
 The Hollywood Palace (2 shows) - Featured singer/dancer - NBC
 French composer Michel Legrand Special - Featured dancer - Paris TV
 Dionne Warwick Special - Featured dancer - CBS
 Telly Savalas Special - Featured dancer - CBS
 Parks also appeared in television specials with Dean Martin and Sammy Davis, Jr.

 Parks appeared in To Tell the Truth as herself

Theater

 The Selling of the President Her First Roman The Emperor Jones - Principal - NY & European Tour, with James Earl Jones
 The Great White Hope with James Earl Jones
 Bittersweet - Principal - Long Beach C.L. Opera, with Shirley Jones
 More Than You Deserve - Principal - NY Shakespeare Festival, with Fred Gwynne
 They're Playing Our Song - Principal - Grand Dinner Theatre, with Joanne Worley
 House of Flowers '92 - Principal - East Coast Tour, with Patti LaBelle
 In Dahomey - New Federal Theatre at the Harry De Jur Playhouse, New York
 Sophisticated Ladies - Starring - US Tour
 National Tai Pai Theatre - Guest Soloist - European Concert
 Changes - Principal - Theatre de Lys
 Ovid's Metamorphoses - Principal - Mark Taper Forum, Los Angeles
 Catch a Rising Star Bread, Beans and Things - Co-Star - Aquarius Theatre, Los Angeles
 Black Ballet Jazz - Guest Artist - European Tour
 Black Diamonds - Guest Artist - John Houston Theatre
 I Don't Want to Cry No More Deux Anges Sont Venus - Guest Artist - Théâtre de Paris
 Sights and Sounds at Carnegie Hall
 Eleo Pomare Dance Company - Guest Artist
 Tribute to Sammy Davis Jr. - New York
 Trina's Tribute to Duke Ellington - One-Person Show
 The Fabulous Palm Springs Follies - 6 years

Choreography

 Clytemnestra & Agamemnon Rumba Trio - Lulu Washington Dance Company Golden Globe Awards Car Wash movie tour "Tribute to the Black Woman" concert Carousel''

References

External links

1947 births
Living people
American stage actresses
People from Brooklyn
20th-century American actresses
21st-century American actresses
American television actresses
African-American actresses
American film actresses
20th-century African-American women
20th-century African-American people
21st-century African-American women
21st-century African-American people